Matt Stevic (born 12 November 1979) is an Australian rules football field umpire in the Australian Football League (AFL). He has umpired 449 career games in the AFL, which has him sitting currently at number 4 on the All-time Games umpired list.  The 449 games includes ten grand finals.
Stevic was born in Leongatha, Victoria. He made his debut umpiring his first match in the AFL in Round 1, 2004, between the Western Bulldogs and the West Coast Eagles at the Telstra Dome, and he has since umpired internationally. 

He used to teach physical education, business management and geography at secondary schools, including Melbourne Grammar, Scotch College and Xavier College.

As of the end of the 2021 season, Stevic has umpired in ten grand finals. His first, alongside Brett Rosebury and Simon Meredith, was the 2012 AFL Grand Final; after not being selected in 2013, he has since umpired nine consecutive grand finals from 2014 until 2022. He has umpired a total of 51 finals matches in his career, a record among all umpires in VFL/AFL history; and his ten Grand Finals puts him equal with Jack Elder for most Grand Finals umpired.

Stevic studied applied science (sport coaching and administration) at Deakin University with a major in sport coaching.

Footnotes

External links
Matt Stevic at AFL Tables

Australian Football League umpires
Living people
1979 births
People from Leongatha
Deakin University alumni